WAP, kazal, immunoglobulin, kunitz and NTR domain-containing protein 1 is a protein that is encoded by the WFIKKN1 gene. when found in humans.

This gene encodes a secreted multidomain protein consisting of a signal peptide, a WAP domain, a follistatin domain, an immunoglobulin domain, two tandem Kunitz domains, and an NTR domain. These domains have been implicated frequently in inhibition of various types of proteases, suggesting that the encoded protein may be a multivalent protease inhibitor and may control the action of multiple types of serine proteases as well as metalloproteinases.

References

Further reading